Tomasz Bednarek and Mateusz Kowalczyk was the defending champions, but Bednarek chose not to compete. Kowalczyk decided to participate in Strabag Prague Open instead.

Kamil Čapkovič and Igor Zelenay defeated Gero Kretschmer and Alexander Satschko in the final.

Seeds

Draw

Draw

References
 Main Draw

Košice Open
2013 ATP Challenger Tour